All the Wrong Reasons may refer to:

 "All the Wrong Reasons", a 2010 episode of the television series Cougar Town
 All the Wrong Reasons (film), a 2013 Canadian comedy-drama
 "All the Wrong Reasons" (song), a 1991 song by Tom Petty and the Heartbreakers on their album Into the Great Wide Open

See also
For All the Wrong Reasons